The Echmiadzin Gospels (Yerevan, Matenadaran, MS. 2374, formerly Etchmiadzin Ms. 229) is a 10th-century Armenian Gospel Book produced in 989 at the Monastery of Bgheno-Noravank in Syunik.

The book 

The manuscript has 232 extant leaves which measure approximately 32 by 25.5 cm.  The book was made under the patronage of bishop Stepanos and written by the scribe Hovhanes. The binding of the book is made of two carved ivory plaques, probably of Byzantine manufacture of the 6th century. Bound into the book are two leaves (fols. 228–229) with miniatures dating to the late 6th—early 7th century (so-called 'Final Four Miniatures').

Eusebian Canons 

The art historian Carl Nordenfalk considered the Eusebian canon tables of the Echmiadzin Gospels (fols. 1–5, including the Eusebian letter) to be the best representative of the original table design (column arrangement, pattern of frame, ornament, etc.) developed in Caesarea Palaestina at the time of Eusebius (1st half of the 4th century). Taking into account the Caesarean type of the Armenian text of the Gospels, Nordenfalk concluded that the Echmiadzin Gospels were copied from a Caesarean codex equipped with the Eusebian canon tables.

References
Nordenfalk, C. "Die spätantiken Kanontafeln". Gothenburg, 1938.

External links
 Index of Armenian Art: Manuscripts:Matenadaran, Ms. 2374, Etchmiadzin Gospels, the 'Final Four Miniatures' (short description, page images)

989
10th-century biblical manuscripts
Armenian literature
History of religion in Armenia
Gospel Books
10th-century illuminated manuscripts